Juliet Nene Akano (born May 22, 1963) is a Nigerian politician. She was elected to the House of Representatives in 2007 and in 2011.

Life
Akano was born in Kano State in 1963 to Godson and Alice Obasi from Arochukwu. She was not brought up in Kano state as her family moved whilst she was still a baby. As a child she lived in Enugu where her mother taught and her father worked in the Ministry of Finance's offices.

She was elected to the National House of Assembly to represent Nwangele/Isu and Njaba local government areas in Imo State. She served from 2007 when she was the Deputy Chairman of the Committee on Women Affairs.

In 2008 she announced a scholarship scheme for 20 children in primary year 3 to cover their primary education and for those 20 who were top in year 6 in their government area then a scholarship would pay for their junior education. Akano issued a denial regarding her own, allegedly forged, school certificate. She was in the House of Assembly until 2011. She was one of eleven women who were elected in 2007 who were re-elected in 2011 when the lower house was nearly 95% male. Other women elected included Mulikat Adeola-Akande, Abike Dabiri, Nkiru Onyeagocha, Uche Ekwunife, Nnena Elendu-Ukeje, Olajumoke Okoya-Thomas, Beni Lar, Khadija Bukar Abba-Ibrahim, Elizabeth Ogbaga and Peace Uzoamaka Nnaji.

In 2015 she was a candidate to become a senator in the upper house for Orlo in Imo State.

References 

1963 births
Living people
People from Kano State
Members of the House of Representatives (Nigeria)
Women members of the House of Representatives (Nigeria)